Dorsa Smirnov is a wrinkle ridge system at  in eastern Mare Serenitatis on the Moon. It is 222 km long and was named after Soviet geologist Sergei Sergeevich Smirnov by the IAU in 1976.

The small crater Very is adjacent to the Dorsa.  Dorsa Lister are roughly parallel with Dorsa Smirnov and to the south of them.  Dorsa Aldrovandi are roughly parallel to Dorsa Smirnov and to the east at the edge of the mare.

References

External links

LAC-42
Dorsa Smirnov at The Moon Wiki
 

Ridges on the Moon
Mare Serenitatis